The men's 60 metres event at the 1971 European Athletics Indoor Championships was held on 13 March in Sofia.

Medalists

Results

Heats
First 4 from each heat (Q) qualified directly for the semifinals.

Semifinals
First 3 from each heat (Q) qualified directly for the final.

Final

References

60 metres at the European Athletics Indoor Championships
60